Gazi Sohel is a Bangladeshi cricketer. He made his List A debut for Old DOHS Sports Club in the 2019–20 Dhaka Premier Division Cricket League on 15 March 2020.

References

External links
 

Date of birth missing (living people)
Living people
Bangladeshi cricketers
Old DOHS Sports Club cricketers
Place of birth missing (living people)
Year of birth missing (living people)